Lamba may refer to:
 Lamba (surname)
 Lamba (Faroe Islands), a small village
 Lamba, Shetland, an uninhabited island in the Shetland Islands
 Lamba, Democratic Republic of the Congo
 Lamba, Togo
 Jad people (Lamba), a community found in Himachal Pradesh
 Lamba people, a major ethnic group of Togo
 Lamba people (Zambia), an ethnic group of Zambia
 Lamba language, a language of Zambia
 Lamba (garment), traditional garment of Madagascar
 A type of Pinisi, Indonesian boat